The Dunbar Professional Championship was a golf tournament that was played from 1986 to 1991. It was a 72-hole stroke-play event on the "Tartan Tour", the PGA in Scotland's schedule. Total prize money was £10,000, rising to £12,500 in 1990 and £14,000 in 1991. Russell Weir won three times in succession from 1988 to 1990.

Winners

References

Golf tournaments in Scotland
Recurring sporting events established in 1986
Recurring sporting events disestablished in 1991
1986 establishments in Scotland
1991 disestablishments in Scotland